Leona Lewis is a British singer, songwriter and vocal producer. She has recorded material for a demo album, five studio albums and an EP. She has also collaborated with other artists for duets and featured songs on other artists' albums, charity singles and soundtracks. Before winning the third series of the UK version of The X Factor, Lewis recorded a demo album entitled Best Kept Secret in 2004 and 2005, which was licensed by UEG Entertainment but not released. It was released by UEG in 2009, who claimed that they had the rights to the album, though Lewis revealed she had never signed a contract that stated Best Kept Secret could possibly be released.

After winning The X Factor in December 2006 and signing a  contract with Simon Cowell's record label Syco and Clive Davis's J Records, Lewis began to work with writers Ryan Tedder and Steve Mac, among others, for her debut studio album Spirit, which was released in November 2007. The first single, "A Moment Like This", was released the day after Lewis won The X Factor, and its second single, "Bleeding Love", was released in October 2007. Lewis also covered Roberta Flack's "The First Time Ever I Saw Your Face" for the album. Cowell conceptualised the song "Footprints in the Sand", and was thus credited as a songwriter. Lewis also co-wrote the song "Here I Am" with Walter Afanasieff. The re-release of Spirit in November 2008 was followed by a cover of Snow Patrol's "Run".

According to Lewis, her second studio album, Echo was more guitar-orientated than Spirit. In addition to working with Tedder again, Lewis collaborated with Justin Timberlake on the track "Don't Let Me Down", for which he provided background vocals, and Kevin Rudolf on "Love Letter". Australian recording artist Che'Nelle co-wrote the song "Can't Breathe" with Lewis and five other songwriters. Lewis appeared on the soundtrack to the 2009 film Avatar on a song called "I See You (Theme from Avatar)". In August 2011, Lewis released a summer single entitled "Collide", a collaboration with Avicii. Although it was originally intended to be the lead single from her third studio album Glassheart, it was not included in the final track list. The singer released Hurt: The EP in December 2011, to bridge the gap for fans while she finished Glassheart, released in November 2012. The EP consisted of three covers: "Hurt" by Nine Inch Nails, "Iris" by the Goo Goo Dolls and "Colorblind" by Counting Crows.

Prior to the release of Glassheart, Lewis revealed that the album content would be very different from that which is present on Spirit and Echo, stating that although it would be "experimental", it would still have a "classic" sound. "Trouble", the lead single featuring Childish Gambino, combines elements of hip hop and trip hop music genres. It was also co-written by Lewis with Emeli Sandé, amongst others. Sandé co-wrote two other tracks called "I to You" and "Sugar". She also wrote a track entitled "Mountains" which was originally planned to be included on Glasshearts track list, however Sandé decided to reclaim the song and include on her debut album, Our Version of Events. Fraser T Smith, who was appointed by Lewis as the albums executive producer, was heavily involved with Glasshearts songwriting sessions, and is credited for co-writing "Trouble", "Un Love Me", "Come Alive", "Stop the Clocks" and "Fingerprint". Lewis reunited with Tedder on the track "Glassheart", a dubstep inspired song. Lewis co-wrote the song "Shake You Up" with Rodney "Darkchild" Jerkins and Olivia Waithe.

Songs

Notes and sample credits

References

Lewis, Leona